"London Girls" is a song by Chas & Dave from the album Job Lot, which was released as a single on 13 February 1983 and entered the UK Singles Chart at number 99. The song stayed in the charts for 9 weeks and peaked at number 63 on 26 March 1983.

Composition
The song was written in 1980 in a writing session with Dave Peacock in a cottage in Ashton, East Northamptonshire.

Covers
Tori Amos recorded a cover of "London Girls" in 1996 during the Boys for Pele album sessions; it was released as a b-side on her maxi single for "Caught a Lite Sneeze" together with another Chas & Dave song, "Thats What I Like Mick (The Sandwich Song)" in the United Kingdom. It was released with "Talula" in the United States.

The Belgian group De Strangers released a Flemish version titled "'n Antwârpse Griet" (Antwerp Girls), which reached No. 36 on the Belgian chart.

See also 
 Chas & Dave discography

References

1983 singles
Chas & Dave songs
Novelty songs
Songs about London